Muslim Tatriev (born 11 January 1980,  Grozny) is a Russian political figure and a deputy of the 8th State Duma. 

Tatriev obtained a position in the law enforcement. Later, he engaged in business. From March 2020 to September 2021, he was the executive director at the RN Ingushneft. He left the post to become the deputy of the 8th State Duma.

References

1980 births
Living people
United Russia politicians
21st-century Russian politicians
Eighth convocation members of the State Duma (Russian Federation)
People from Grozny